Charroux may refer to:

Places
 Charroux, Allier, commune in the department of Allier, France
 Charroux, Vienne, commune in the department of Vienne, France
 Charroux Abbey, in Charroux, Vienne, France

People with the surname
Gaby Charroux (born 1942), French politician
Robert Charroux, French writer

French-language surnames